Petra Lovas (born 4 July 1980) is a Hungarian table tennis player.

She competed at the 2008 Summer Olympics, reaching the first round of the singles competition.

References

2008 Olympic profile

1980 births
Living people
Hungarian female table tennis players
Table tennis players at the 2008 Summer Olympics
Table tennis players at the 2016 Summer Olympics
Olympic table tennis players of Hungary
Table tennis players from Budapest